The Allier is a river in central France. It is a left tributary of the Loire. Its source is in the Massif Central, in the Lozère department, east of Mende. It flows generally north. It joins the Loire west of the city of Nevers.

Departments and towns 

The Allier flows through the following departments, and along the following towns:
 Allier: Moulins, Varennes-sur-Allier, Vichy, Saint-Yorre
 Ardèche - the river runs along the border between this department and Lozère
 Cher: Mornay-sur-Allier, Château-sur-Allier
 Haute-Loire: Brioude, Langeac, Monistrol-d'Allier
 Lozère: Langogne, La Bastide-Puylaurent
 Nièvre
 Puy-de-Dôme: Brassac-les-Mines, Auzat-sur-Allier, Issoire, Cournon-d'Auvergne, Pont-du-Château, Cournon-d'Auvergne

Tributaries 

The main tributaries of the Allier are:
 Chapeauroux (left side)
 Senouire (right side)
 Alagnon (left side)
 Anse
 Couze Pavin (left side)
 Dore (right side)
 Dolore (left side)
  (left side)
 Sioule (left side)
 Monne (left side)
 Veyre (left side)

Ecology

The Allier is one of the rare places in southern Europe where the freshwater grayling (Thymallus thymallus), known in French as ombre des rivières, occurs in a natural habitat.

Grayling like to live in shoals and are sensitive to pollution. In the Allier these fish are more abundant in the stretch between Langogne and Brioude. They are economically important, being appreciated for food and fished for sport.

Gallery

References

Rivers of France
 
Rivers of Allier
Rivers of Ardèche
Rivers of Cher (department)
Rivers of Haute-Loire
Rivers of Lozère
Rivers of Nièvre
Rivers of Puy-de-Dôme
Rivers of Bourgogne-Franche-Comté
Rivers of Centre-Val de Loire
Rivers of Auvergne-Rhône-Alpes
Rivers of Occitania (administrative region)